Phyllonorycter baldensis is a moth of the family Gracillariidae. It is found in northern Italy.

External links
Fauna Europaea

baldensis
Moths described in 1986
Endemic fauna of Italy
Moths of Europe